Werneria bambutensis is a species of toad in the family Bufonidae. It is endemic to western Cameroon where it occurs at high altitudes between Mount Manengouba and Mount Oku, including the eponymous Bamboutos Mountains. It is also known as the Bamboutos smalltongue toad and Bambouto torrent toad.

Description
The body is compact and the legs are short and thick. The snout is short and rounded. No tympanum is visible. The toes are fully webbed. The dorsum and the flanks are dark greenish-olive to clear bronze, with a gold shimmer or blackish speckles. The dorsolateral line (present in most other Werneria) is only weakly present on the sides of the head. The lower parts are uniformly grey to white with grey spots.

Habitat and conservation
Outside the breeding season, it also seems to disperse away from streams into forest patches, open bamboo glades, and montane grassland. During the dry season, adults may hide under stones in streams. It is a rare species that appears to have declined at many known localities, possibly because of chytridiomycosis. It is further threatened by habitat loss (i.e., deforestation). It is not known from protected areas, although it might be present in the Bafut-Ngemba Forest Reserve.

References

bambutensis
Frogs of Africa
Amphibians of Cameroon
Endemic fauna of Cameroon
Amphibians described in 1972
Taxa named by Jean-Louis Amiet
Taxonomy articles created by Polbot
Fauna of the Cameroonian Highlands forests